Lucas Domingues Piazon (born 20 January 1994) is a Brazilian professional footballer who plays for Botafogo, on loan from Primeira Liga club S.C. Braga. He plays as a second striker or a winger, as an attacking midfielder.

He spent a decade at Chelsea, though he only played three games for them (one in the Premier League), and was loaned to seven clubs in six countries.

Early life
Piazon was born in São Paulo, to António Carlos Piazon, a commercial representative, and Marizabel Domingues, a lawyer. He had a financially secure upbringing that allowed him to focus on both school and football at the same time. Both of Piazon's parents took an active role in his career. He grew up with his sister Juliana, who is three years younger than him and was a Chelsea supporter from an early age, aspiring to play for them some day.

When he was young, Piazon's family moved to Paraná. Piazon's football skills began to blossom at age eight. He developed an interest in futsal (indoor football) like other Brazilian footballers (such as Zico and Ronaldinho). He began playing for Coritiba. At the age of 11, Piazon made the switch from indoor to the field.

Club career

Youth career
Piazon began his professional career with Coritiba. He made an impression with them becoming top scorer in every youth tournament he appeared in. In 2007, he moved to neighbouring club, Atlético Paranaense. He again turned out, as Atlético reached the finals of the U-15 Copa do Brasil in 2008, which they eventually lost to São Paulo. São Paulo became very impressed with his performance and made an offer. At the age of 14, Piazon left his family behind in Curitiba and joined São Paulo. In May, he began to attract the attention of international scouts when he helped guide São Paulo through the Brazilian qualifiers for the Premier Cup (Nike Cup). It was around this time that he was also called up by Brazil's U-15s. In August, São Paulo travelled to Manchester for the Premier Cup finals. In the Group stage, Piazon scored in the 3–0 win versus Manchester United. São Paulo then went on to beat Werder Bremen in the final match.

Chelsea
In early 2011, Chelsea secured the services of Piazon by means of a pre-contract, having to fight off the interest from a number of the world's leading clubs, including Italian team Juventus. On 15 March 2011, São Paulo announced that Piazon could only play for the Chelsea senior team after 20 January 2012 when he became eligible to obtain a work visa, but he would join in the 2011 summer transfer window. Chelsea announced ten days later with Piazon passing a medical in London in early March 2011. It was reported that Chelsea paid in the region of £5 million to acquire Piazon, which could rise to £10 million depending on several clauses. He was transferred to Chelsea during the 2011 summer transfer window and started playing for the reserves. In an interview, he stated, "[I chose Chelsea because] I like the Premier League. I think my way of playing and my skills are more suited to the Premier League."

Piazon made his debut for the reserve team against Fulham, thereafter saying, "I am able to play in the Youth Cup now. Everybody knows I am here to play, so my main aims for the season are to play as many youth games as possible and hopefully feature in the reserves as well, and I want to win the Youth Cup." He also stated, "I am enjoying the company of Ramires, Alex and, of course, David Luiz is my best friend here. He is so funny and always joking so it's nice." Piazon scored his first reserve goal in an away victory against Arsenal, just before full-time with a solo effort, inside the box before firing it into the net. He scored twice in five games for the reserves and once in six for the youth team, most notably the winner in the FA Youth Cup tie against Doncaster Rovers.
He won the FA Youth Cup on 9 May 2012 against Blackburn, although failing to score in the match.

On 20 January 2012, his 18th birthday, Piazon obtained a work visa and became eligible to play for the Chelsea senior team. On 26 January 2012, he signed a contract extension that would keep him with the club until 2017. After impressing at Under-18 and Reserve level, Piazon was given the number 35 shirt, which was previously worn by Juliano Belletti. He was an unused substitute on the Chelsea bench, on 31 January 2012, in their 1–1 league draw against Swansea City and on 5 February 2012, in the 3–3 draw against Manchester United. Chelsea manager André Villas-Boas said, after the Manchester United game, "He [Piazon] has trained more with the first team, which is very good for him. He's made great progress since arriving and in the last two games was on the bench. Unfortunately, he had no opportunity to enter, but has  done a great job in the reserves team. He is a player that we have high hopes for."

On 10 May 2012, Piazon was named Chelsea Young Player of the Year in his first season. He was part of the side that won the FA Youth Cup Final 24 hours earlier. "I am very happy and I didn't expect this. It has been a fantastic week for me. David Luiz and Ramires have helped me a lot here as when I came in I was alone. I hope to be at Chelsea a long time and I will keep working." he said. Later that week, he was named on the bench on the final day of the season, in a home game against Blackburn Rovers which Chelsea won 2–1, but was not involved in the game. He stated that he was looking forward to continuing his development and would like to make the breakthrough into the senior side, saying "I hope to be in the main group, train with them every day and if I have a chance to play some games." He went on to say that he had "always dreamed of playing for Chelsea."

2012–13 season
The pre-season prior to the start of the 2012–13 season, Piazon was given a chance to prove himself by Chelsea manager Roberto Di Matteo after being taken on tour in the United States, came on as a substitute in three of the four matches, making his senior debut in the 4–2 win over Seattle Sounders. He scored his first goal in his second senior Chelsea appearance, the equaliser to earn Chelsea a 1–1 draw against Paris Saint-Germain at Yankee Stadium. Afterwards, he spoke of his delight: "It was good for me, it was special, to score in my second game", said the forward. Piazon came on in the 3–2 defeat to the MLS All-Stars in the 2012 MLS All-Star Game and was an unused substitute in the following fixture, with Fernando Torres taking his place in a 1–0 loss to Milan.

Piazon was named in Chelsea's 22-man Champions League squad, along with fellow Brazilians Oscar, David Luiz and Ramires and was chosen ahead of Florent Malouda. Piazon made his competitive debut for Chelsea, starting in their League Cup fixture against Wolverhampton Wanderers, which ended a 6–0 win for the Blues, also assisting the goal for Ryan Bertrand. On 31 October 2012, Piazon played his second game in the League Cup against Manchester United, which ended 5–4 win for Chelsea after extra time with Piazon being substituted in the 55th minute for Eden Hazard. Piazon netted a goal in the U-19's comprehensive 6–0 defeat of Molde on 8 November in the NextGen Series.
On 23 December, he made his Premier League debut in an 8–0 win against Aston Villa, during which he assisted a goal for Ramires and took a penalty kick which he had won, only for it to be saved by Aston Villa goalkeeper Brad Guzan.

Loan to Málaga
During the 2013 January transfer window, Piazon was loaned to Spanish La Liga side Málaga until the end of the season. He made his debut for Málaga on 24 January 2013, coming on as a substitute in the 4–2 home defeat in the Copa del Rey quarter-final against Barcelona. On 16 February, he assisted Javier Saviola's winner in a 1–0 home win against Athletic Bilbao. On 9 March 2013, Piazon made his second assist for Málaga with a ball from a free-kick that found Martín Demichelis, who headed to score in a 1–1 draw against Real Valladolid.

Loan to Vitesse
On 9 August 2013, Piazon was loaned to Eredivisie club Vitesse until the end of the 2013–14 season. On 17 August 2013, he made his debut for Vitesse in a 1–1 draw at Roda JC. On 22 September, Piazon scored his first goals in his professional career and for Vitesse, scoring a brace in the 3–0 win at home to PEC Zwolle. In the following Eredivisie fixture, against NEC, Piazon scored the winner for Vitesse in the 92nd minute, from outside the box, which ended 3–2 on 29 September. On 19 October 2013, he scored a brace and assisted Patrick van Aanholt's winner, as Vitesse came from 2–0 down to win 3–2 at Heerenveen. On 24 November, Piazon scored two penalties at Go Ahead Eagles in a 3–0 win. In Vitesse's fixture away to PSV on 7 December, Piazon scored another goal as Vitesse convincingly won 6–2 to stay at the top of the Eredivisie table.

Loan to Frankfurt
On 24 July 2014, Piazon joined Frankfurt on loan for the 2014–15 season. On 2 August, he scored his first goal in a 4–2 friendly win against Sampdoria.

On 23 August, Piazon made his debut in the Bundesliga against SC Freiburg, a 1–0 victory. His first Bundesliga goal came on 28 September against Hamburger SV; having came off the bench in the 86th minute for Stefan Aigner, in the 90th minute he struck a free-kick from nearly 30 yards out to seal a 2–1 victory.

Loan to Reading
On 31 August 2015, Piazon joined Reading on a season-long loan deal. On 11 September, he made his debut and provided an assist to Oliver Norwood in a 5–1 triumph against Ipswich Town coming on as a 77th-minute substitute for Matěj Vydra. Fifteen days later, he scored his first goal for Reading in a 2–1 win against Burnley. Piazon returned to Chelsea on 28 April 2016, a week before his loan deal was due to expire.

Loan to Fulham
On 31 August 2016, Piazon joined Fulham on a season-long loan, joining Chelsea teammate Tomáš Kalas. He made his Fulham debut and scored his first goal for the club in a 2–1 EFL Cup defeat against Bristol City on 21 September.

On 17 January 2017, Piazon's loan at Fulham was extended until the end of the season. On 14 July 2017, Piazon's loan was extended for a further season.

On 15 August 2017, Piazon suffered a fracture-dislocation of his right ankle after a tackle from Leeds player Conor Shaughnessy in their 0–0 draw at Elland Road. He had successful surgery and rehabilitation.

Loan to Chievo

In January 2019, he joined Chievo Verona on loan. He played four times before returning to Chelsea.

Loan to Rio Ave
In September 2019, he joined Rio Ave on loan, until the end of the 2020–21 season.

Braga 
On 14 January 2021, Piazon signed for Portuguese side Braga. He agreed to a four-year contract with the club. On 23 May 2021, he scored a goal in a 2–0 win over Benfica in the Taça de Portugal Final.

Loan to Botafogo
On 10 March 2022, Piazon returned to his home country after 11 years, as he was announced at Botafogo on loan until June 2023.

International career
Piazon has represented Brazil at both under-15 and under-17 levels. At under-15 level, he helped his team to second place in the South American Under-15 Football Championship of 2009 in Bolivia, being the top goalscorer with ten goals.

At the under-17 level, during an international game for Brazil's U17 squad against Paraguay, Piazon scored an extraordinary goal when he kicked the ball with such force that it broke through the side netting of the goals, in a game which they went on to lose 2–1. In the 2011 FIFA U-17 World Cup, he scored in a 3–3 draw against the Ivory Coast.

Style of play
A tactical player, Piazon is known for his flair, passing, powerful shooting, free-kicks, penalty kicks, reading of the game and clinical finishing. Piazon commented on his playing style, "I'd say my playing style is different from typical Brazilian forwards. When you think about these, you think about dribbles and flashy moves. My football is simpler and more direct. It's more like a midfielder playing up front. I like to pass quickly. I don't hog the ball and I don't tend to run with it."

The media have often drawn comparisons between Piazon and Brazilian playmaker Kaká, as the pair possess similar attributes and natural technical finesse. Piazon also somewhat resembles Kaká. However, Piazon has rejected comparisons saying: "I don't think [we are similar]", Piazon says of Kaká. "My style and his style are different because I am a winger, or a second striker, and he is a central midfielder. He went on to say, "I don't think the comparison is because of our style. I think it is because we both played at São Paulo and maybe we can look similar on the pitch sometimes."

Career statistics

Honours
Chelsea U18
FA Youth Cup: 2011–12

Fulham
EFL Championship play-offs: 2018

Braga
Taça de Portugal: 2020–21

Brazil U17
South American U-17 Championship: 2011

Brazil U20
Toulon Tournament: 2014

Individual
Chelsea Young Player of the Year: 2011–12

References

External links

 

 Chelsea profile

1994 births
Living people
Footballers from São Paulo
Brazilian people of Italian descent
Brazilian footballers
Expatriate footballers in England
Expatriate footballers in Spain
Expatriate footballers in the Netherlands
Expatriate footballers in Germany
Expatriate footballers in Italy
Expatriate footballers in Portugal
Brazilian expatriate footballers
Brazilian expatriate sportspeople in England
Brazilian expatriate sportspeople in Spain
Brazilian expatriate sportspeople in the Netherlands
Brazilian expatriate sportspeople in Germany
Brazilian expatriate sportspeople in Portugal
Association football forwards
Chelsea F.C. players
Málaga CF players
SBV Vitesse players
Eintracht Frankfurt players
Reading F.C. players
Fulham F.C. players
A.C. ChievoVerona players
Rio Ave F.C. players
S.C. Braga players
Botafogo de Futebol e Regatas players
Premier League players
La Liga players
Eredivisie players
Bundesliga players
English Football League players
Serie A players
Primeira Liga players
Brazil youth international footballers
Brazil under-20 international footballers
Footballers at the 2015 Pan American Games
Pan American Games bronze medalists for Brazil
Pan American Games medalists in football
Medalists at the 2015 Pan American Games